So Long Gulliver (Italian: Ciao Gulliver) is a 1970 Italian drama film directed by Carlo Tuzii and starring Lucia Bosé, Antonello Campodifiori and Sydne Rome.

Cast
 Lucia Bosé as Evelyne  
 Antonello Campodifiori as Daniele  
 Sydne Rome as Gloria  
 Lorenzo Piani as Friend  
 Marco Ferreri as Priest  
 Lea Padovani as Woman  
 Enrico Maria Salerno as Boss

References

Bibliography 
 James Monaco. The Encyclopedia of Film. Perigee Books, 1991.

External links 
 
 So Long Gulliver at Variety Distribution

1970 drama films
Italian drama films
1970 films
1970s Italian-language films
Films directed by Carlo Tuzii
Films scored by Piero Piccioni
1970s Italian films